MJT may refer to:
 Mytilene International Airport on Lesbos Island, Greece
 Multi-jackbolt tensioner, for fastening parts together
 Sauria Paharia language, spoken in the Bengal area
 MJT + 3, a jazz ensemble led by Walter Perkins (musician)